Line 2 is a planned rapid transit line of the Ho Chi Minh City Metro, Vietnam. Line 2 is the city's second metro line, and will connect District 1 and District 12. Site clearance for the line is currently underway, with construction scheduled to be complete in 2030.

Stations

References 
Rapid transit in Vietnam
Transport in Ho Chi Minh City
Public transport in Ho Chi Minh City
2030 in rail transport
Ho Chi Minh City Metro lines
Underground rapid transit in Vietnam